Patricia Marie Gomez Tumulak (born March 3, 1988) is a Filipino beauty pageant titleholder and actress. She came from a large family with a Filipino, Japanese and Spanish lineage from the Visayas region. She currently resides in Quezon City, Metro Manila.

Personal life and education 
Born on March 3, 1988, Patricia Marie Gomez Tumulak is an alumna of Miriam College and hails from Quezon City. She graduated with a Degree of Bachelor of Science in Child Development and Education Minor in Special Education. Prior to joining Miss Philippines Earth 2009, she went to a public school and did some voluntary teaching. She is planning to take up her Masters in Special Education and dreams of building her own pre-school.

Miss Philippines Earth 2009 
Tumulak joined the national Miss Philippines Earth 2009 beauty pageant, which was contested by 50 delegates representing various towns, cities, provinces, and overseas Filipino communities in the beauty contest that promotes environmental awareness.

In the final competition of the Miss Philippines Earth 2009, she was announced as one of the 10 semi-finalists who moved forward to compete for the title. She achieved one of the five highest scores in the swimsuit and evening gown competitions for her stage chops, which advanced her as one of the top five finalists to participate in the final round of the event.

At the conclusion of the pageant, she received the Miss Science and Technology award and was crowned Miss Philippines Fire 2009. She was crowned by the outgoing titleholder Kristelle Lazaro at The Arena Entertainment and Recreational Center of the People, San Juan, Philippines.

Binibining Pilipinas 2011 
Patricia competed at the Binibining Pilipinas 2011 pageant where she was chosen as one of the Top 15 semifinalists.

Miss Multiverse International 2014

She was appointed and given the title of Miss Multiverse Philippines 2014 and represented the Philippines at the Miss Multiverse International 2014 pageant on November 24 in Punta Cana, Dominican Republic.

Filmography

Television

References

External links 
Official Miss Earth website
Miss Earth Foundation website

Living people
1988 births
American beauty pageant winners
American female models
Binibining Pilipinas contestants
Filipino emigrants to the United States
Filipino female models
Filipino people of American descent
GMA Network personalities
GMA Integrated News and Public Affairs people
Miriam College alumni
Miss Philippines Earth winners
People from Honolulu
People from Quezon City
Star Magic